Arturo Peña Aznar (21 November 1903 – 13 December 1969) was a Spanish long-distance runner. He competed in the men's 5000 metres at the 1928 Summer Olympics.

References

1903 births
1969 deaths
Athletes (track and field) at the 1928 Summer Olympics
Spanish male long-distance runners
Olympic athletes of Spain
Place of birth missing